The 1898 Wisconsin Badgers football team represented the University of Wisconsin in the 1898 Western Conference football season. Led by third-year head coach Philip King, the Badgers compiled an overall record of 9–1 with a mark of 2–1 in conference play, placing third in the Western Conference. The team's captain was Pat O'Dea.

Schedule

References

Wisconsin
Wisconsin Badgers football seasons
Wisconsin Badgers football